Sundaresta is a genus of tephritid  or fruit flies in the family Tephritidae.

Species
Sundaresta hilaris Hering, 1953

References

Tephritinae
Tephritidae genera
Diptera of Asia